The Kurganets-25 is a tracked amphibious, 25-ton modular infantry fighting vehicle and armored personnel carrier being developed for the Russian Army. The Kurganets-25 will evolve into various models, gradually replacing BMP, BMD, MT-LB and other types of tracked Soviet armored platforms. 
The Kurganets-25 will have modular armor that can be upgraded for specific threats.

The Kurganets-25 IFV and APC variants were first seen in public (initially with the turret and main armament shrouded) during rehearsals for the 2015 Moscow Victory Day Parade. Serial production was supposed to begin in 2016, however as of 2020, certification by the military is still pending.

Design
The Kurganets-25 is designed to bring the Russian tracked troop carrier fleet up to standard with Western designs like the American M2 Bradley and British Warrior, which outclassed their Soviet Cold War BMP-series counterparts. The Kurganets-25 is based on the Armata Universal Combat Platform while being lighter than the T-15 Armata "heavy IFV" based on the same and similar to the wheeled VPK-7829 Bumerang. 

There are two versions of the vehicle: a heavily armed infantry fighting vehicle carrying 6-7 troops, and a lightly armed APC carrying 8 troops. Other variants proposed for the Kurganets include an armored ambulance, an 82 mm Vasilek mortar carrier, an anti-tank vehicle, an armored recovery vehicle, a reconnaissance vehicle, a command vehicle, and an armored engineering vehicle. 

The vehicle represents a departure from traditional Russian low profile designs, having a higher floor more suited for mounted combat rather than troop carrying, which provides better IED and mine protection. While the T-15 is expected to be deployed with T-14 tanks in armored formations, Kurganets-25 platforms will equip mechanized units.

Armament
The Kurganets-25 IFV features the Bumerang-BM remote control turret with its 2A42 30 mm autocannon, a 7.62 mm coaxial PKT machine gun and a bank of two Kornet-EM anti-tank guided missiles on either side. The Kurganets-25 APC variant has a 12.7 mm MG RWS instead of the Bumerang-BM turret.

An SPAAG version with a 57 mm autocannon and a Kurganets-25 SPG with a 125 mm are planned.

Mobility
The Kurganets-25 weighs 25 tonnes. This allows the Kurganets-25 to be light enough to be mobile on water. The maximum speed of the vehicle is 80 km/h on land and 10 km/h on water. Both the IFV and APC variants have a front-mounted 800 hp engine

Protection
The Kurganets-25 IFV has 360-degree coverage from its active protection system launcher tubes. This APS is smaller than the one found on the T-14 Armata and T-15, but like the T-15, it is attached close the top of the hull. A two-part projectile detection system is placed on various places on the hull and turret. The Kurganets-25 APC variant, when revealed in the 2015 Moscow Victory Day Parade, had a scaled down APS system which was mounted only on the turret with none on the hull.

Ergonomics and Crew
According to the first vice president and co-owner of Concern Tractor Plants, Albert Bakov, the Kurganets-25 uses a console similar to a Sony PlayStation gamepad. It is wider than previous generations of Russian APCs and IFVs. The front located engine increases crew comfort and ease of access.

Variants
A few different versions of Kurganets-25 are in development.
 Kurganets-25 IFV (Industrial designation – Object 693);
 Kurganets-25 APC (Industrial designation – Object 695).
 Kurganets-25 ARV – Equipped wth a crane, a winch and armed with a 12.7mm heavy machine gun.

Operators
 
 Russian Ground Forces were to receive the first batch of Kurganets-25 IFVs for trials in 2019.

See also
 Bumerang-BM
 VPK-7829 Bumerang
 T-15 Armata
 Typhoon (AFV family)

References

External links

Infantry fighting vehicles of the post–Cold War period 
Infantry fighting vehicles of Russia
Armoured personnel carriers of Russia
Amphibious infantry fighting vehicles
Amphibious armoured personnel carriers
Tracked infantry fighting vehicles
Armoured personnel carriers of the post–Cold War period
Kurganmashzavod products